Ryan Downey is a singer/songwriter from Melbourne, Australia.

Early life
Ryan Downey grew up in rural Victoria, Australia. At age of 10 he was diagnosed with juvenile arthritis. In 2016, Downey explains "I was a young boy with an old man's body. There were days when I couldn't walk and during the worst of it my hair turned grey for a while. Being a forced bystander through those early years really bound me to my love of art, music and cinema."

Career

2013–2014: Familiar Ground by Venice Music
In July 2013, Downey released his debut 4-track EP Familiar Ground under the moniker Venice Music on Gaga Digi. The EP was produced by Casey Rice. In a review of the EP, Stephanie Tell from The Music AU said "Ryan Downey's captivatingly dark, baritone voice immediately strikes you".

2015–2017: Me & Her
In 2015, Downey broke his left arm which left him unable to play any instrument for six weeks. During this time, he recorded a "vocals based" EP titled Me & Her which was released on 22 March 2016.
The EP contained two originals and songs written and recorded by female songwriters. Downey said "The album was a true joy to make and these songs provided the greatest company, I hope you enjoy them too." The Music AU described the EP as "A jaw-dropping set of gorgeously constructed voice work".

2018–2019: Running
On 13 February 2018, The Music Network revealed Downey had signed with Barely Dressed Records and Remote Control Records and released the single "Running". Two further singles were released and on 13 April 2018, Downey released his debut studio album, Running. Australian Independent Record Labels Association described the album as "jaw-droppingly beautiful" and Alastair Cairns from Happy Mag said "Running is his immaculately crafted debut album and it provides the perfect introduction to an artist that has been gathering momentum for some time now." The album was produced by Steve Hassett and recorded across New York and Melbourne, with subject material ranging from humour and pathos, self-analysis and love.

The album made the 2018 Australian Music Prize long list.

2020–present: A Ton of Colours
In February 2021, it was announced that Downey had signed with Dot Dash Recordings. Downey said of the signing: "I'm very excited to be joining the Dot Dash fam, their gene pool is outstanding. Not only are they the easiest, most supportive people to work with, they're so incredibly hard working and they believe in the art." To coincide with the announcement, Downey announced his second studio album, A Ton of Colours (stylised as A TON OF COLOURS) and released its lead single "Heart Is an Onion". Downey enlisted producer Burke Reid for this album after hearing the rawness Reid brought to Julia Jacklin's Crushing and Courtney Barnett's Tell Me How You Really Feel albums. Downey said "I'd written these big drama-filled songs that I wanted to be represented vividly and playfully, but balanced with realness in the recordings, which Burke understood immediately." A Ton of Colours was released on 14 May 2021. The album was proceeded by the singles "Heart Is An Onion", "Contact" and "Half Light".

Touring 
Ryan has toured nationally, including performances at BIGSOUND, Melbourne Recital Centre, Museum of Old and New Art, St Kilda Festival and headline shows and has opened for artists including Marlon Williams, Middle Kids, Julia Jacklin, Sarah Blasko and Emma Louise.

Discography

Studio albums

Extended plays

Singles

Album appearances

References

External links
 

21st-century Australian singers
Living people
Singers from Melbourne
Year of birth missing (living people)